The 28th Virginia Infantry Regiment was an infantry regiment raised in Virginia for service in the Confederate States Army during the American Civil War. It fought mostly with the Army of Northern Virginia. The 28th Virginia completed its organization at Lynchburg, Virginia, in June, 1861. Its members were raised in the counties of Botetourt, Craig, Bedford, Campbell, and Roanoke.

After fighting at First Manassas, the unit was assigned to General Pickett's, Garnett's, and Hunton's Brigade, Army of Northern Virginia. It was active in the campaigns of the army from Williamsburg to Gettysburg except when it served with Longstreet at Suffolk. The 28th moved to North Carolina, then was on detached duty at Richmond. It fought at Cold Harbor, endured the battles and hardships of the Petersburg trenches, and was engaged in various conflicts around Appomattox.

The regiment totaled 600 men in April, 1862, and reported 40 casualties at Williamsburg, and 47 at Seven Pines. It lost 12 killed and 52 wounded at Second Manassas, had 8 killed and 54 wounded during the Maryland Campaign, and, of the 333 engaged at Gettysburg, half were disabled. Also at Gettysburg, the regiment's battle flag was captured by the 1st Minnesota Infantry Regiment. Many were captured at Sayler's Creek, but 3 officers and 51 men survived to surrender on April 9, 1865.

Battle flag

Among the losses was its regimental flag which was taken by the 1st Minnesota Regiment at Gettysburg and still resides in the Minnesota Historical Society.
Private Marshall Sherman of the First Minnesota Infantry captured the regiment's battle flag at Gettysburg. He was subsequently awarded the Congressional Medal of Honor.

Notable veterans
The field officers were Colonels Robert C. Allen, Robert T. Preston, and William Watts; Lieutenant Colonels Samuel B. Paul and William L. Wingfield; and Majors Michael P. Spesard and Nathaniel C. Wilson.
Company officers: Henry S. Trout.

See also

List of Virginia Civil War units

References

Further reading
 Abbott, Dabney, Claude A. Thompson, and Claude A. Thompson. Snow Family Papers. 1754. Abstract: Transcripts of documents and genealogical writings regarding the Snow family of Bedford County, Va. and the related Thompson family. Items include copies of the 1781 will of Thomas Snow and an inventory of his estate and copies of Bible records. A transcript of a letter from Dabney Abbott, 28th Virginia, 1862 May 19, describes fighting in the Peninsular Campaign. The collection also contains a town plan of New London Town, Bedford County, 1761, and a bond for the use of an African American blacksmith. The collection also contains a transcript of the 1842 will of Clement Jordan mentioning three slaves to remain unsold. The collection also contains a typescript of extracts from the National Archives pension records on soldiers named Snow who fought in the Revolutionary war. The collection also contains seven journals, 1852-1873, of Mr. Pannill's general store in Leesville, Campbell County, Va.
 Confederate States of America. Guard Register. 1861. Abstract: Kept in the area of New Bern, N.C., and at Richmond and Yorktown, Va., during the period of September 6, 1861, to March 13, 1862. Includes names of guards and prisoners, and lists of countersigns and prisoner offenses.
 Fields, Frank E. The 28th Virginia Infantry Regiment, C.S.A. 1984. 
 Fields, Frank E. 28th Virginia Infantry. Lynchburg, Va: H.E. Howard, 1985. 
 Hill, Patrick M. 2000. "Colors of Valor: The 28th Virginia Regiment's Flag in Minnesota". Minnesota History. 
 Painter, James Barney, and William H. Hamilton. Letters of James Barney Painter. 1861. Abstract: Painter writes about Confederate camp life and battles in which he participated, particularly 1st and 2nd Bull Run, Antietam and Fredericksburg. He describes mutilation of Union dead after 1st Bull Run, his refusal to fight under the proposed black flag of "no quarter," rations, wages, and hard marching, and advises his brother to stay out of the army. Also contains a letter from another soldier in the regiment, William H. Hamilton.
 Rees, Charles R. Unidentified Soldier in Confederate Uniform and Craig's Rifles, or 28th Virginia Infantry Regiment, Kepi with Musket. Ambrotype/Tintype Filing Series (Library of Congress). 1861. 
 Simmons, J. K. A Touch of History: The Blue Ridge Rifles, 12-27-1859-4-9-1865, Company A, 28th Virginia Volunteer Regiment (Infantry) a Roll of Honor and Reminiscences. Fincastle, Va: Botetourt County Historical Society, 1995. 
 Simmons, William Bower. Journal. 1861. Abstract: Simmon's account of his war service with the Blue Ridge Rifles (part of the 28th Virginia Infantry); also a partial typed transcription. The journal covers the year 1861, but may actually have been written later.
 Simmons, J. K. An Epitome of the Blueridge Rifles, or, Company A, Twenty-Eighth Regiment, Virginia Volunteer Infantry: Why, When and Where the Blueridge Rifles Were Organized. [Sikeston, MO]: [J.D. Taul], 1991. Transcript made in 1991 by James D. Taul. Imprint from letter of transmittal.
 Snuggs, Anne Linebarger. Anne Linebarger Snuggs Papers. 1803. Abstract: Seven letters, February 1863-October 1864, from Thomas James Linebarger (1838-1928), while he was a Confederate captain with the 28th North Carolina Regiment in Virginia, to his sister, Anne Linebarger, discussing casualties and fighting, especially in the Wilderness Campaign; T.J. Linebarger's terse diary, 1861-1869, listing events of his Civil War experiences and life during Reconstruction in Catawba County, N.C., with cryptic references to Ku-Klux Klan activities; and a few other items.
 Tarbox, Jessica A. Spoils to the Victor?: Ownership of the 28th Virginia Battle Flag. 2004. St Cloud University. Thesis. 77 pages.
 Wilson, Nathaniel C., 1839-1863. Nathaniel C. Wilson Civil War Letter and Diary, 1863. Virginia Military Institute Archives, 1863. Abstract: One letter, March 1863, discussing activities of his unit on the march in North Carolina; discusses supplies, food, surrounding countryside. Also diary [fragment, some pages missing] kept by Wilson during the Gettysburg Campaign, covering period 25 June through 3 July. Wilson was killed in action on July 3. These items are part of the Nathaniel C. Wilson Papers.
 Woodson, William David. War Recollections of Lieut. Wm. D. Woodson: Company K, 28th Virginia Regiment, Including an Account of His Escape from Johnson's Island, a Feat Accomplished by Only One or Two Men, Besides Him, During the Civil War. Lynchburg, Va: Liggan & Holt, printers, 1911.

External links
Battle of South Mountain

Units and formations of the Confederate States Army from Virginia
1861 establishments in Virginia
Military units and formations established in 1861
1865 disestablishments in Virginia
Military units and formations disestablished in 1865